Blues for Fred is an album by jazz guitarist Joe Pass that was released in 1988. It was recorded as a tribute to singer and dancer Fred Astaire, who died the previous year.

After many albums produced by Norman Granz (who sold Pablo to Fantasy Records in 1987), this is Pass's first album with producer Eric Miller.

Reception

Writing for Allmusic, music critic Scott Yanow wrote of the album "Pass interprets the music with taste, solid swing, and constant creativity within the bop tradition. His versions of "Cheek to Cheek," "Night and Day," "Lady Be Good" and "The Way You Look Tonight" in particular are quite enjoyable and make one appreciate the uniqueness of this classic guitarist." The All About Jazz review concluded "While the novelty of Pass's skills had long worn off by now, the talent still remains. Virtuoso is still his crowning achievement, but Blues For Fred is of similar artistic merit."

Track listing

Personnel 
 Joe Pass - guitar

References 

1988 albums
Joe Pass albums
Fred Astaire tribute albums
Pablo Records albums